Tharakki Patti is a village in the Northern Indian state of Uttar Pradesh. It is located in the Tarab Ganj taluk of Gonda district.

Villages in Gonda district